Acacia epacantha is a shrub of the genus Acacia and the subgenus Pulchellae that is endemic to an area in the south west of Australia.

Description
It blooms from July to August and produces yellow flowers.

Taxonomy
The species was first formally described by the botanist Bruce Maslin in 1979 as a part of the work Studies in the genus Acacia (Mimosaceae) - 9 Additional notes on the Series Pulchellae Benth. as published in the journal Nuytsia. It was reclassified as Racosperma epacanthum in 2003 by Leslie Pedley then transferred back to genus Acacia in 2006.

Distribution
It is native to an area on the west coast in the Wheatbelt region of Western Australia where it is commonly found growing in gravelly lateritic loam or clay soils.

See also
 List of Acacia species

References

epacantha
Endemic flora of Southwest Australia
Acacias of Western Australia
Taxa named by Bruce Maslin
Plants described in 1979